West Almond Churches is a set of two historic church buildings in West Almond, Allegany County, New York.  They are now known as: West Almond Community Center (formerly West Almond Baptist Church) and West Almond Town Hall (formerly West Almond Methodist Episcopal Church).  Both structures were built in 1861 in the Greek Revival style.

It was listed on the National Register of Historic Places in 2000.

References

Churches on the National Register of Historic Places in New York (state)
Greek Revival church buildings in New York (state)
Churches completed in 1861
19th-century Baptist churches in the United States
19th-century Methodist church buildings in the United States
Buildings and structures in Allegany County, New York
1861 establishments in New York (state)
National Register of Historic Places in Allegany County, New York